The Caranguejeira Conglomerate is an Aptian to Cenomanian geologic formation in Portugal. Dinosaur remains diagnostic to the genus level are among the fossils that have been recovered from the formation.

Paleofauna 
 Duriatitan humerocristatus
 Lourinhasaurus alenquerensis
 Megalosaurus insignis
 Morosaurus marchei (theropod indet.)
 Pelorosaurus humerocristatus (sauropod indet.)

Correlation

See also 
 List of dinosaur-bearing rock formations
 List of stratigraphic units with few dinosaur genera

References

Bibliography

Further reading 
 H.-E. Sauvage. 1895. Les dinosauriens du terrain jurassique supérieur du Boulonnais [The dinosaurs from the Upper Jurassic terrain of the Boulonnais]. Bulletin de la Société Géologique de France, 3e série 22:465-470

Geologic formations of Portugal
Lower Cretaceous Series of Europe
Cretaceous Portugal
Aptian Stage
Conglomerate formations
Fossiliferous stratigraphic units of Europe
Paleontology in Portugal